This is a list of mines in Romania. It is organized by product.

Coal
Anina Mine
Berbeşti Coal Mine
Bărbăteni Coal Mine
Comănești Coal Mine
Câmpulung Coal Mine
Căpeni Coal Mine
Filipești Coal Mine
Husnicioara Coal Mine
Jilţ Coal Mine
Livezeni Coal Mine
Lonea Coal Mine
Lupeni Coal Mine
Motru Coal Mine
Paroşeni Coal Mine
Petrila Coal Mine
Prigoria Coal Mine
Rovinari Coal Mine
Roşia – Peşteana Coal Mine
Sărmăşag Coal Mine
Uricani Coal Mine
Voivozi Coal Mine
Vulcan Coal Mine
Şotânga Coal Mine
Ţebea Coal Mine

Iron
Băişoara mine
Dognecea mine
Ghelari mine
Lueta mine
Muncelu Mic mine
Ocna de Fier mine
Teliuc mine

References 

 
Romania